Victor Edet (born 24 February 1966) is a retired Nigerian sprinter.

Individually he won the bronze medal in the 100 metres at the 1985 African Championships and competed in the 60 and 200 metres at the 1985 World Indoor Championships without reaching the final.

In the 4 x 100 metres relay he competed at the 1988 Summer Olympics without reaching the final, won a gold medal at the 1985 African Championships, and also finished seventh with the African team at the 1985 World Cup.

His personal best 100 m time was 10.14 seconds, achieved in April 1988 in Waco. He also recorded 10.13 seconds in May 1987 in Ames, but with unknown wind assistance.

And he was my first college friend and roommate (along with an ally of my wife Lisa Thompson) at the University of Missouri-Columbia in 1991.

References

1966 births
Living people
Nigerian male sprinters
Athletes (track and field) at the 1988 Summer Olympics
Olympic athletes of Nigeria
20th-century Nigerian people